Susu may refer to:     
 Susu people or Soussou, an ethnic group in Guinea
 Susu language, language spoken by this ethnic group   
 Sosso Empire, a twelfth-century Takrur kingdom of West Africa   
 Susu (savings), an informal savings account practiced in the Caribbean    
 Susu account, a saving scheme for poor people in Ghana   

SUSU may refer to:   
 South Ural State University   
 University of Southampton Students' Union   
 Sheffield University Students' Union   
 Staffordshire University Students' Union
 Swansea University Students' Union

Language and nationality disambiguation pages